Louis Mbarick Fall (16 September 1897 – 15 December 1925), known as Battling Siki, was a French light heavyweight boxer born in Senegal who fought from 1912 to 1925, and briefly reigned as the World light heavyweight champion after knocking out Georges Carpentier.

Early years 
He was born in the port city of Saint-Louis, French Senegal. As a teenager, he dived from the top of a cliff to fetch coins thrown by the French from the sea.  He was noticed by a Dutch dancer who offered to take him to Europe, where he worked washing dishes.  Then at 14 years old, he began his career in boxing. Siki's early years were inauspicious. From 1912 to 1914 he compiled a record of just eight wins, six losses and two draws.

When World War I erupted, Siki joined the French army, serving in the 8th Colonial Infantry Regiment. During the war he was decorated for bravery in battle with the Croix de Guerre and the Médaille Militaire, before being honorably discharged.

Post-war career 

After his discharge from the military, Siki resumed his boxing career. In October and November 1920 Siki boxed two matches in the Concertgebouw in Amsterdam. He was romantically involved with a Dutch woman, Lijntje van Appelteer, who became his common-law wife. On 16 December 1921, she had a son, Louis Junior. In this period he taught boxing at the amateur boxing club De Jonge Bokser (The Young Boxer).

From 1 November 1919, until he faced Georges Carpentier for the world light heavyweight championship in 1922, Siki compiled the impressive record of 43 wins in 46 bouts (21 KOs), suffering just one loss (on a decision) and two draws. Carpentier, the reigning World and European champion, agreed to fight Siki for the title, and they met in Paris, on 24 September 1922.

Siki claimed that he had agreed to take a dive, but when Carpentier dropped Siki, the outraged Siki decided to get up and fight. Although he had agreed to throw the fight, he did not intend to get beat up doing so.

In the sixth round Siki hit Carpentier with a powerful right uppercut that appeared to put Carpentier down and out for the count. The referee, however, claimed Siki had tripped Carpentier, and awarded the bout to the unconscious champion on a foul. Fearing a riot from the aroused crowd, the three ringside judges overruled the referee, and Siki was eventually declared the champion.

Siki then embarked on a well publicized rampage of partying and carousing. He would walk his pet lion down the Champs-Élysées while wearing his top hat and tuxedo. Siki was known to fire his revolvers in the air in public as a means of prompting his two Great Danes to do tricks. He was constantly reported drinking champagne in night clubs, and spent freely on flashy clothes and partying. He was fond of white women, and both his wives were white.

During this time offers came in from the United States for the colourful Siki to meet the leading heavyweight contender Harry Wills, middleweight champion Johnny Wilson, and the legendary Harry Greb. Attempts were even made to match Siki with the then reigning heavyweight champion Jack Dempsey. 

Instead, Siki signed to defend his title against Irish light heavyweight Mike McTigue on Saint Patrick's Day in Dublin. The bout was controversial and Siki lost on decision, and so lost the title. This defeat was the first loss in a downward trend of dissipation and poor performances by Siki, which culminated in his death a little over a month after his last fight.

After the world title 

After losing his European title on a foul, Siki moved to the United States. His record in the States was poor and he failed to defeat any top-notch fighters. His failure to train properly was evident; his record after winning the title was 11 wins (7 KOS), 17 losses, 1 draw and 2 no contests. It was during this time period that he suffered the only two knockout defeats of his career. On 23 July, he married artist Lillian Werner of Memphis, Tennessee, who was seven years his senior, in a civil marriage. Werner was registered as white, making theirs a rare mixed-race marriage at the time. At the time of his wedding, friends of Siki from France alleged that he was still married to a Dutch woman living in France who had born him a child two years earlier.

Even in the States Siki continued to carouse and train on booze and street brawls. Often, he would get drunk in speakeasies, refuse to pay the tab, and fight his way out.

Murder and burial
On 15 December 1925, he was stopped by a policeman who saw him staggering drunk on 42nd Street, not far from his apartment in New York City. Siki stated that he was on his way home, and walked off. Later he was found lying face down, shot twice in the back at close range, dead at the age of 28.

The Rev. Adam Clayton Powell, the father of Adam Clayton Powell, Jr., presided over his funeral, which was held in Harlem, New York. He was survived by his widow Lillian Werner Phal, whom he had married a year earlier.

He was initially buried at Flushing Cemetery, in an unmarked grave. There were brief ceremonies held in the Flushing Cemetery on 46th Ave and was participated in by representatives of the Senegalese government and of the African Boxing Union: a headstone was dedicated here by the International Veterans Boxing Association. Cherif Djigo, first consul at the Senegalese Mission to the United Nations, stated "This stone represents to us a grand symbol that Battling Siki has not been forgotten". His body was repatriated to Senegal in 1993.

Trivia 

Battling Siki vs. Carpentier was viewed by a young Ernest Hemingway.
Battling Siki was also the name of one of Che Guevara's commanders.

Professional boxing record
All information in this section is derived from BoxRec, unless otherwise stated.

Official record

All newspaper decisions are officially regarded as “no decision” bouts and are not counted in the win/loss/draw column.

Unofficial record

Record with the inclusion of newspaper decisions in the win/loss/draw column.

See also
List of light heavyweight boxing champions

References

External links

Battling Siki - CBZ Profile
Autobiography

1897 births
1925 deaths
Senegalese male boxers
French male boxers
French murder victims
Male murder victims
People of French West Africa
French military personnel of World War I
Light-heavyweight boxers
World boxing champions
Senegalese people murdered abroad
People murdered in New York City
Deaths by firearm in Manhattan
Sportspeople from Saint-Louis, Senegal
Senegalese emigrants to the United States
European Boxing Union champions
French sportspeople of Senegalese descent
Recipients of the Croix de Guerre 1914–1918 (France)
Recipients of the Médaille militaire (France)